Traumazine is the second studio album by American rapper Megan Thee Stallion, released on August 12, 2022, by 300 Entertainment and 1501 Certified.

Upon release, Traumazine received positive reviews from critics, who complimented its production and Megan’s flow. The album was preceded by five singles: "Sweetest Pie", with English singer Dua Lipa, released on March 11, 2022, "Plan B", released on April 22, 2022, "Pressurelicious", featuring American rapper Future, released on July 21, 2022, Her", released on August 15, 2022, and Ungrateful", with American rapper Key Glock released on September 6, 2022, Apart from Lipa, Future, and Glock the album features additional guest appearances from Latto, Pooh Shiesty, Rico Nasty, Jhené Aiko, Lucky Daye, Sauce Walka, Lil' Keke, and Big Pokey.

Background
In 2020 Megan Thee Stallion filed suit against her record label 1501 Certified Entertainment to renegotiate her contract, after her management company Roc Nation found it "iffy". When Something for Thee Hotties was released the record label didn't recognize it as an album, because it has 29 minutes of new material instead of 45, so the rapper would have to release two more albums in addition to Something. On February 18, 2022, Megan filed suit against the label claiming that Something respects the definition of an album with at least 45 minutes of material.

On August 11, 2022, Megan took to Twitter to announce that her second studio album Traumazine would be released the next day. The rapper also wrote about the lawsuit, expressing her disappointment and emotional distress at the difficulty she is experiencing in releasing her music, but ending her message to fans with the phrase "we almost out".

Megan defined the album title as referring to a chemical released in the brain when forced to deal with "painful emotions caused by traumatic events and experiences. See synonyms: self-realization".

Composition
Lyrically, Traumazine contains themes related to self-expression, the empowerment of African-American women, death, and overcoming difficult moments in life. In an interview with Ebro Darden and Nadeska Alexis of Apple Music, the rapper discussed the meaning of the record project:Usually when I write songs […] I could be sad. […] I don't write songs about how I feel, I write songs about how I want to feel. So I feel like, on this album, it's probably the first time I figured out how to talk about what I want to say… express myself a little bit more. So that's just how I've been living life. And I feel like it's been so easy for people to tell my story for me, speak on my behalf because I'm a nonchalant person, I feel like. […] But like I see now that it can get out of control so I feel like I wanted to just take control of my narrative, take control of my own story. Tell it my way, tell it from me.

Critical reception

Traumazine was met with a very positive response from critics. At Metacritic, which assigns a normalized rating out of 100 to reviews from professional publications, the album has an average score of 80 based on 11 reviews.

Time journalist Moises Mendez II wrote that the rapper "alternates between knocking down every obstacle that stands in her way and realizing that some obstacles will take longer to get past than others", adding "with Traumazine, we see her dig deeper into her insecurities", citing the "most gut-wrenching lines in the album", referring to her parents' death. Mendez additionally noted the "dark and ominous" production tone, with lyrical references to the difficult rise for an African American woman in the music industry and the legal battle to dissolve her 1501 Certified record contract.

NPR editor Sidney Madden defined the album as a "huge artistic step" because "tracks are offset with deep contemplations about the trauma she's experienced in her life so far and, more pointedly, the double standards in society that black women carry with them when they're objectified". Madden states that it is comparable to a diary in which "she's having a stream of conscious. [...] It's raw. It's real. And it can't be faked".

In a more reserved review for AllMusic, Fred Thomas described the album as, "solid but inconsistent, with one foot in formula-tested mainstream rap and the other in a more confessional, emotionally bare territory that's new for Megan Thee Stallion. Despite its occasional unevenness, the album is exciting in both its moments of audience-tested hitmaking and when Megan cracks the veneer of her invincible persona to share feelings that are difficult, messy, and real."

Commercial performance
Traumazine debuted at number four on the US Billboard 200 with 63,000 album-equivalent units (including 8,000 pure album sales), becoming Megan Thee Stallion's fifth US top-10 album.

Track listing

Note
  indicates an additional producer

Personnel
 Colin Leonard – mastering (1–14, 17)
 Mike Dean – mastering, mixing (15, 16, 18)
 Jaycen Joshua – mixing (1–14, 17)
 Shawn Jarrett – engineering (1–14, 16–18)
 Joshua Queen – engineering (10)
 Zeke Mishanec – engineering (15)
 Mark Shick – engineering (18)
 Sage Skofield – additional mixing (4)
 DJ Riggins – mixing assistance (1–14, 17)
 Jacob Richards – mixing assistance (1–14, 17)
 Mike Seaberg – mixing assistance (1–14, 17)
 Sean Solymar – mixing assistance (15)
 Tommy Rush – mixing assistance (15)

Charts

Weekly charts

Year-end charts

Release history

References

2022 albums
Megan Thee Stallion albums
Surprise albums
Albums produced by J. White Did It
Albums produced by Murda Beatz
Albums produced by Juicy J
Albums produced by OG Parker
Albums produced by Taz Taylor (record producer)
Trap music albums